The 2021 Fanatec GT World Challenge Australia Powered by AWS was an Australian motor sport competition for GT cars. The series incorporated the "Motorsport Australia GT Championship", the "Motorsport Australia Endurance Championship", the "GT3 Trophy Series" and the "GT4 Cup", however the Endurance Championship could not be contested due to the COVID-19 pandemic. The Motorsport Australia GT Championship was the 25th running of an Australian GT Championship. This was the first season of the championship being jointly managed by Australian Racing Group (ARG) and SRO Motorsports Group.

Calendar
The provisional six-race calendar was released on 16 December 2020 with all rounds taking place in Australia. The first round at Phillip Island was postponed to 13–14 March from its original 20–21 February date, after a snap lockdown was enacted in response to an outbreak of COVID-19 cases in Melbourne. The round at Sandown and the two Endurance Championship races at Tailem Bend and Bathurst were cancelled and replaced by one round at Bathurst due to the COVID-19 pandemic.

Entry list

Race results
Bold indicates overall winner

Championship standings
Scoring system

See also
2021 GT World Challenge Europe
2021 GT World Challenge Europe Sprint Cup
2021 GT World Challenge Europe Endurance Cup
2021 GT World Challenge Asia
2021 GT World Challenge America

Notes

References

External links

GT World Challenge Australia – Sporting Regulations 2021 –Version 2, motorsport.org.au, as archived at web.archive.org

Australian GT Championship
GT World Challenge Australia